Debbie Cenziper is a Pulitzer Prize-winning American investigative journalist and nonfiction author.  she writes for ProPublica and is the director of the Medill Investigative Lab at Northwestern University. She spent more than a decade as an investigative reporter at The Washington Post, and has  written two nonfiction books.

Early life and education 
Cenziper grew up in Philadelphia and graduated from the University of Florida, in 1992.

Career
She worked as a reporter for the Miami Herald, The Charlotte Observer, and the South Florida Sun-Sentinel. 

She won a 2007 Pulitzer Prize for a series of articles exposing corruption and waste in the Miami-Dade Housing Agency, which the Miami Herald published in 2006. She was a Pulitzer Prize finalist in 2006 for a series of stories on breakdowns in the nation's hurricane-forecasting system. 

She spent more than a decade as an investigative reporter at The Washington Post. During her time there, she was one of the lead authors of "The Pandora Papers", an award-winning 2021 international investigation about the covert movement of money around the world, co-published with the International Consortium of Investigative Journalists. 

In April 2019 she was named the director of The Medill Investigative Lab Northwestern University's Medill School of Journalism.

 Cenziper writes for ProPublica.

Books
She is the co-author of the nonfiction book Love Wins: The Lovers and Lawyers Who Fought the Landmark Case for Marriage Equality. The book, published in 2016 by William Morrow, tells the story behind the landmark Obergefell v. Hodges Supreme Court case which ruled that the fundamental right to marry is guaranteed to same-sex couples. The book received a starred review by Booklist and was named a notable book of 2016 by The Washington Post.

Her second nonfiction book, Citizen 865: The Hunt for Hitler's Hidden Soldiers in America,  was published on November 12, 2019, by Hachette Books. In a review in The Washington Post, Jonathan Kirsch wrote, "Cenziper brought her investigative skills to bear on the challenge of retrieving the hard facts, but she also possesses the gift of a storyteller....[Citizen 865 is] a highly significant work of investigation that is eye-opening and heartbreaking. She compels us to confront the crimes of the Trawniki men in a way that burns itself into both memory and history."

Recognition 
She is a frequent speaker at universities, national writing conferences, book clubs and festivals. She has been a guest on dozens of television and radio shows, including CNN, MSNBC and NPR’s Talk of the Nation. She and her stories at the Miami Herald were featured in a national PBS documentary on investigative reporting; her work at The Washington Post was featured in an award-winning, full-length documentary film, released nationwide in 2013. 

In June 2017, she was named in a question on the game show Jeopardy! Host Alex Trebec asked contestants, "Like Bob Woodward at The Washington Post, Debbie Cenziper is this type of reporter, from the Latin for 'to track.'"

Awards
 
 Society of Professional Journalists, Gene Miller Award for Investigative Reporting, 2004, 2005, 2006, 2007
 Investigative Reporters and Editors Award, winner, 2004, finalist, 2005, 2006, 2012, 2013
 Florida Society of Newspaper Editors, gold medal for public service, 2005, 2006, 2007
 Pulitzer Prize finalist, explanatory reporting, 2006
 Pulitzer Prize, local reporting, 2007
 Sigma Delta Chi Award for investigative reporting, 2007
 Harry Chapin award for reporting on hunger and poverty, 2007
 Harvard University's Goldsmith Prize for Investigative Reporting, grand prize, 2009, finalist, 2007
 University of Florida, Outstanding Young Alumni Award, 2008
 George Polk Award for Metropolitan Reporting, 2008
 Maryland Press and Virginia Press awards, 2008, 2009, 2011
 Heywood Broun award for substantial distinction, 2009, finalist 2014
 American Society of Newspaper Editors, local accountability award, 2014
 Robert F. Kennedy Human Rights Award , 2014
 Book award finalist, Investigative Reporters and Editors (IRE), 2019
 2021 (for Pandora Papers): Scripps Howard Award, national/international investigative reporting; Scripps Howard Award, impact award; Overseas Press Club, Malcolm Forbes Award; White House Correspondents Association, Katharine Graham Award for Courage and Accountability

Works

References

External links
"House of Lies", The Miami Herald

Living people
Year of birth missing (living people)
Place of birth missing (living people)
Pulitzer Prize for Local Reporting winners
George Polk Award recipients
The Washington Post people
Miami Herald people
University of Florida alumni
American women journalists
21st-century American women